This is the discography of the Norwegian rock/country group Hellbillies.

The band started out in early 1990s and has sold over 600,000 records in Norway. To date, they have released 11 studio albums, three live albums and one compilation album.

Discography

Studio albums

Compilations

Live albums

Videos

References

External links
Norwegian charts of Hellbillies

Discographies of Norwegian artists
Country music discographies
Rock music group discographies